Fujino (written:  or ) is a Japanese surname. Notable people with the surname include:

, Japanese writer
, Japanese mixed martial artist, kickboxer and professional wrestler
, Japanese drifting driver
, Japanese writer 
, Japanese voice actress
, Japanese swimmer
, Japanese politician
, Japanese engineer and businessman
, Japanese cyclist
, Japanese slalom canoeist
, Japanese politician

Fictional characters
, a character in the anime series My-HiME
, a character in the hentai manga Hatsuinu

Locations 

 Fujino, Shizuoka, a region covering the southwestern foot of Mount Fuji, Japan

Fujino, Kanagawa, a former town in Tsukui District, Kanagawa Prefecture, Japan
Fujino Station, a railway station in Midori-ku, Sagamihara, Kanagawa Prefecture, Japan

See also

Japanese-language surnames